Aptostichus stanfordianus, the Stanford Hills trapdoor spider, is a species of wafer-lid trapdoor spider (Euctenizidae) endemic to California in the United States.

References

Further reading

 

Euctenizidae
Endemic fauna of California
Spiders described in 1908
Articles created by Qbugbot
Fauna without expected TNC conservation status